The RMIT School of Vocational Engineering, Health and Sciences is an Australian vocational education school within the College of Science Engineering and Health of RMIT University.

See also
RMIT University

References

External links
School of Vocational Engineering, Health and Sciences

Engineering, Health and Sciences, Vocational
Dental schools in Australia
Nursing schools in Australia
Aviation schools
Computer science departments
Information technology schools
Vocational schools